In measure theory, a branch of mathematics that studies generalized notions of volumes, an s-finite measure is a special type of measure. An s-finite measure is more general than a finite measure, but allows one to generalize certain proofs for finite measures.

The s-finite measures should not be confused with the σ-finite (sigma-finite) measures.

Definition 
Let  be a measurable space and  a measure on this measurable space. The measure  is called an s-finite measure, if it can be written as a countable sum of finite measures ,

Example 
The Lebesgue measure  is an s-finite measure. For this, set

and define the measures  by

for all measurable sets . These measures are finite, since  for all measurable sets , and by construction satisfy

Therefore the Lebesgue measure is s-finite.

Properties

Relation to σ-finite measures 
Every σ-finite measure is s-finite, but not every s-finite measure is also σ-finite.

To show that every σ-finite measure is s-finite, let  be σ-finite.

Then the measures

This approach is just like in the example above.

An example for an s-finite measure that is not σ-finite can be constructed on the set  with the σ-algebra . For all , let  be the counting measure on this measurable space and define

The measure  is by construction s-finite (since the counting measure is finite on a set with one element). But  is not σ-finite, since

So  cannot be σ-finite.

Equivalence to probability measures 
For every s-finite measure , there exists an equivalent probability measure , meaning that . One possible equivalent probability measure is given by

References 

 
 
 
 

Measures (measure theory)